Paku Alam II was a Duke (Adipati) of Pakualaman between 1829 and 1858.
Pakualaman (also written Paku Alaman) became a small hereditary Duchy within the Sultanate of Yogyakarta, as a mirror-image of the Duchy of Mangkunegaran in the territory of the Susuhunanate of Surakarta

The son of Paku Alam I, Paku Alam II was buried at Kota Gede.

Subsequent list of rulers

 Paku Alam III, 1858 – 1864
 Paku Alam IV, 1864 – 1878
 Paku Alam V, 1878 – 1900
 Paku Alam VI, 1901 – 1902
 Paku Alam VII, 1903 – 1938
 Paku Alam VIII, 1938 – 1999
 Paku Alam IX, 1999 – 2015
 Paku Alam X, 2016 –

Family history

Notes

1858 deaths
Dukes of Pakualaman
Pakualaman
Burials at Kotagede
19th-century Indonesian people
Indonesian royalty